Mark Alfred Pierce (March 6, 1896 - April 11, 1959) served in the California State Assembly for the 75th district from 1925 to 1927 and during World War I he served in the United States Army.

References

United States Army personnel of World War I
Republican Party members of the California State Assembly
20th-century American politicians
1896 births
1959 deaths